It's a Wonderful World is the ninth studio album released by Mr. Children, released on May 10, 2002, which marks the tenth anniversary of their first album's release.

Track listing
 overture - 1:56
  - 6:08
 Dear wonderful world - 2:18
 one two three - 5:00
  - 5:14
 youthful days - 5:18
  - 4:53
 Bird Cage - 6:34
  - 5:22
 UFO - 5:07
 Drawing - 5:44
  - 4:33
  - 3:32
  - 3:36
 It's a wonderful world - 4:14

2002 albums
Mr. Children albums
Albums produced by Takeshi Kobayashi
Japanese-language albums